Mike Campaz (born 16 November 1987) is a Colombian footballer who plays for Alianza Panama.

Club career
On 30 January 2018, Neftchi Baku announced the signing of Campaz on a one-year contract. On 24 June 2018, Campaz was demoted to the Neftchi's reserve team, along with Lucas Gómez, for the remainder of his contract.

References

External links
 

1987 births
Living people
Colombian footballers
People from Tumaco
Association football midfielders
Colombian expatriate footballers
Colombian expatriate sportspeople in Costa Rica
Expatriate footballers in Costa Rica
Colombian expatriate sportspeople in Azerbaijan
Expatriate footballers in Azerbaijan
Colombian expatriate sportspeople in Panama
Expatriate footballers in Panama
Neftçi PFK players
Sportspeople from Nariño Department